The women's long jump event at the 2014 African Championships in Athletics was held on August 12 on Stade de Marrakech.

Results

References

2014 African Championships in Athletics
Long jump at the African Championships in Athletics
2014 in women's athletics